Frankfurt Ostendstraße station is an underground S-Bahn station in central Frankfurt am Main, Germany. The station was opened when the City Tunnel was extended to Frankfurt South station in 1990. It consists of two tracks, surrounding a central platform.

Its entrance escalators are located next to the Hanauer Landstraße. The site of the future headquarters of the European Central Bank is nearby.

The train station is served by S-Bahn lines S1, S2, S3, S4, S5, S6, S8 and S9.

References

Rhine-Main S-Bahn stations
Railway stations in Germany opened in 1990
Railway stations located underground in Frankfurt